Ilha Grande do Gurupá is a large river island of the Amazon River delta. It lies in the Brazilian state of Pará, west of Marajó and near the confluence of the Amazon and the Xingu.

This island is part of the Marajó Archipelago.

References

Grande do Gurupa
Landforms of Pará
Islands of the Amazon